The 2019 Akita Masters (officially known as the Yonex Akita Masters 2019 for sponsorship reasons) was a badminton tournament which took place at CNA Arena Akita in Japan from 13 to 18 August 2019 and had a total purse of $75,000.

Tournament
The 2019 Akita Masters was the sixth Super 100 tournament of the 2019 BWF World Tour and also part of the Akita Masters championships, which had been held since 2018. This tournament was organized by the Nippon Badminton Association and sanctioned by the BWF.

Venue
This international tournament was held at CNA Arena Akita in Akita, Akita Prefecture, Japan.

Point distribution
Below is the point distribution table for each phase of the tournament based on the BWF points system for the BWF Tour Super 100 event.

Prize money
The total prize money for this tournament was US$75,000. Distribution of prize money was in accordance with BWF regulations.

Men's singles

Seeds

 Sitthikom Thammasin (third round)
 Suppanyu Avihingsanon (third round)
 Subhankar Dey (withdrew)
 Kazumasa Sakai (third round)
 Firman Abdul Kholik (champion)
 Kunlavut Vitidsarn (withdrew)
 Koki Watanabe (quarter-finals)
 Ihsan Maulana Mustofa (second round)

Finals

Top half

Section 1

Section 2

Bottom half

Section 3

Section 4

Women's singles

Seeds

 Nitchaon Jindapol (withdrew)
 Saena Kawakami (withdrew)
 An Se-young (champion)
 Ayumi Mine (first round)
 Ruselli Hartawan (quarter-finals)
 Zhang Yiman (quarter-finals)
 Lyanny Alessandra Mainaky (first round)
 Sim Yu-jin (first round)

Finals

Top half

Section 1

Section 2

Bottom half

Section 3

Section 4

Men's doubles

Seeds

 Akira Koga / Taichi Saito (final)
 Lee Jhe-huei / Yang Po-hsuan (semi-finals)
 Hiroki Okamura / Masayuki Onodera (second round)
 Keiichiro Matsui / Yoshinori Takeuchi (quarter-finals)
 Ricky Karanda Suwardi / Angga Pratama (second round)
 Ou Xuanyi / Zhang Nan (champions)
 Huang Kaixiang / Liu Cheng (semi-finals)
 Kang Min-hyuk / Kim Jae-hwan (quarter-finals)

Finals

Top half

Section 1

Section 2

Bottom half

Section 3

Section 4

Women's doubles

Seeds

 Nami Matsuyama / Chiharu Shida (quarter-finals)
 Ayako Sakuramoto / Yukiko Takahata (champions)
 Chayanit Chaladchalam / Phataimas Muenwong (withdrew)
 Miki Kashihara / Miyuki Kato (first round)
 Ni Ketut Mahadewi Istirani / Tania Oktaviani Kusumah (first round)
 Putri Syaikah / Nita Violina Marwah (final)
 Natsuki Sone / Sayaka Hobara (quarter-finals)
 Li Zi-qing / Teng Chun-hsun (first round)

Finals

Top half

Section 1

Section 2

Bottom half

Section 3

Section 4

Mixed doubles

Seeds

 Chen Tang Jie / Peck Yen Wei (semi-finals)
 Hoo Pang Ron / Cheah Yee See (second round)
 Ko Sung-hyun / Eom Hye-won (champions)
 Mathew Fogarty / Isabel Zhong (second round)
 Kim Won-ho / Kim Hye-rin (withdrew)
 Park Kyung-hoon / Baek Ha-na (withdrew)
 Guo Xinwa / Zhang Shuxian (quarter-finals)
 Parinyawat Thongnuam / Kittipak Dubthuk (withdrew)

Finals

Top half

Section 1

Section 2

Bottom half

Section 3

Section 4

References

External links
 Tournament Link

Akita Masters
Akita Masters
Akita Masters
Sport in Akita Prefecture
Akita Masters